Benjamin Lee Cline (born February 29, 1972) is an American lawyer and politician who has served as the U.S. representative for Virginia's 6th congressional district since 2019. A member of the Republican Party, he represented the 24th district in the Virginia House of Delegates from 2002 to 2018.

Early life and education
Cline was born on February 29, 1972, in Stillwater, Oklahoma, and grew up in Rockbridge County, Virginia. He is the son of Philip L. Cline and Julie Cline.

Cline graduated from Lexington High School in 1990, and graduated with a B.A. from Bates College in 1994. He earned a J.D. degree from University of Richmond School of Law in 2007.

Career outside of politics
From 2002 to 2007, including his years in law school, Cline was president of NDS Corporation, a Virginia-based company providing sales and marketing assistance to rural Internet and technology businesses. After graduating from law school, he served as an assistant Commonwealth's Attorney for Rockingham County and the city of Harrisonburg until 2013. Before his election to Congress, Cline maintained a private law practice in Lexington, Harrisonburg, and Amherst.

Political career 

Cline served as chief of staff for U.S. Representative Bob Goodlatte before running for office.

Cline began his political career in 2002 in a special election to the Virginia House of Delegates, replacing incumbent Delegate Vance Wilkins, who resigned due to sexual harassment allegations. Cline won with 57% of the vote despite Democratic opposition from former Lexington Mayor Mimi Elrod. Cline represented the 24th district, which consisted of Bath and Rockbridge Counties, the cities of Buena Vista and Lexington, and parts of Amherst and Augusta Counties.

In 2003, Cline won again with 69% of the vote against Independent E.W. Sheffield. In 2005, he won with 62% of the vote against Democrat David Cox. Cline ran unopposed in 2007. In 2009, Cline ran against Amherst native and Democrat Jeff Price and won with 71% of the vote, taking the Lexington City precinct (for the first time since Price's election in 2002) and every precinct in the 24th House of Delegates district. Cline ran unopposed in both 2011 and 2013. In 2015, Cline won 71% of the vote against Democrat Ellen Arthur. In 2017, he was reelected with 72% of the vote against independent candidate John Winfrey.

In November 2017, Cline announced he would run for Congress in Virginia's 6th congressional district in 2018 for the seat being vacated by retiring incumbent Bob Goodlatte. On May 19, 2018, Cline won the Republican nomination on the first ballot at the district convention.

Cline won the election on November 6, 2018, winning 15 Virginia localities with more than 60% of the vote, to the four localities won by his opponent, Jennifer Lewis. (Lewis won Harrisonburg, Lexington, Roanoke and Staunton, but lost all the rest, including a razor's edge loss in her hometown of Waynesboro.) He resigned from the Virginia House of Delegates on December 18, 2018.

State legislative career

Committee assignments 
Cline served on the House of Delegates Committees on Commerce and Labor, Courts of Justice, Finance, and chaired the Militia, Police and Public Safety. He was also a member of Commerce and Labor Subcommittee #2, Commerce and Labor Special Subcommittee on Energy, Courts of Justice Subcommittee on Criminal Law, Courts of Justice Subcommittee on Judicial Systems and Finance Subcommittee #2. Cline also co-chaired the Virginia Joint Legislative Conservative Caucus, co-chaired in the Senate of Virginia by Mark Obenshain.

Education 
In 2006, Cline patroned HB1125, which created a school sales tax holiday in the Commonwealth, and HB1135, which allowed members of the military stationed in the Commonwealth to receive in-state tuition in Virginia.  In 2007, he patroned HB2168, which created the Community College Transfer Grant Program. In 2008, Cline supported the opening of an Amherst branch of Central Virginia Community College and new facilities for the Rockbridge branch of Dabney S. Lancaster Community College. In 2009, Cline patroned, but did not have included in the final state budget, amendments to cut the budget of the Virginia Lottery in half, which would in turn put those funds into the Literary Fund used to fund Virginia public schools.

Government regulation 
In 2006, Cline passed two bills, HB1130 and HB1131, that changed the administrative setup of the Virginia Department of Game and Inland Fisheries. In 2009, he passed HB2285, which created a searchable database of Virginia's agency expenditures. Additionally, Cline went after the Virginia Lottery in 2009 for the allotment of over $1 million of state funds to use the likeness of Howie Mandel and Donald Trump on lottery tickets.

Criminal prosecution 
In 2003, Cline introduced HB2229, which deals with probation for underage alcohol possession. In 2004, he introduced HB1204, which increased penalties for people with multiple offenses pertaining to driving while intoxicated. In 2007, he patroned HB2453, which enhanced penalties for repeated offenders of driving without a license, and HB2459, which increased the penalties for elder abuse. In 2008, he passed HB1362, which established a penalty for the misuse of public assets, and HB1363, which increases penalties for trademark counterfeiting. In 2009, he patroned HB2441, which requires Virginia Department of Corrections to notify prosecutors of gang affiliation of inmates charged with an offense committed while in prison, and HB2637, which requires fingerprinting of people arrested for violating a protective order.

Public safety 

Cline introduced HB2227, which made it a felony to assault retired law enforcement officers, and HB865, which imposed the same penalty regarding assault of campus police officers. In 2003, he introduced HB2230 and HB2232 to help local probation officers and pretrial services officers. In 2005, he introduced HB1514, which allowed sheriffs' offices and volunteer rescue squads to be reimbursed for the costs of responding to DUI crashes. Cline was named Legislator of the Year by the Virginia Court Clerks' Association in 2011 and by the Virginia Sheriff's Association in 2012.

Cline also introduced several bills regarding the rights of defendants and inmates. In 2003, he introduced HB2231, which gives probation officers greater access to juvenile defendants' records so that risk assessments could be more easily prepared. In 2009 he opposed the closure of the Natural Bridge Juvenile Correctional Center, the last remaining facility solely for nonviolent offenders in the Commonwealth of Virginia at the time of its closing, and introduced HB873 in 2010 to require the Department of Juvenile Justice to keep at least one facility open for nonviolent juvenile offenders. In 2012, Cline helped negotiate a compromise between law enforcement and prisoner advocates regarding HB836, which restricted the usage of restraints on pregnant inmates, by supporting the intent of the legislation in the form of a rule change by the Virginia Board of Corrections, winning praise locally for his involvement on the issue. In 2013, Cline helped craft and supported HB2103, which improves parole process for inmates still eligible for parole in Virginia.

Abortion 
Carmen Forman of The Roanoke Times called Cline "staunchly anti-abortion." In 2007 and subsequent years, he introduced legislation requiring that information regarding the option of providing anesthesia to the baby be given to women seeking abortions after 20 weeks and requiring doctors to do so if requested by the mother.

Civil liberties 
In 2013, Cline patroned HB2229 to address ongoing concerns over the Federal National Defense Authorization Act of 2012. The allegation was that the NDAA allowed the federal government to detain and seize American citizens within the United States and hold them without access to legal counsel or trial, in violation of the United States Constitution. HB2229 stated that if the federal government wished to detain an American citizen on those grounds, it first needed to notify the chief law enforcement official in the individual's locality or do so within 24 hours of the detention. The bill further stated that failure to comply with the law would lead to the Virginia General Assembly reviewing any Memorandum of Understanding (MOU) between the federal government and the Commonwealth of Virginia and that any further action on the MOU and any funding in pursuit of the MOU would be contingent on an affirmative vote of the General Assembly.

Cline introduced a similar bill in 2014 (HB1256) and 2015 (HB2144). In 2013, the bill passed the House of Delegates with bipartisan support 83-14 and the Senate 31–9 with an amendment. The House rejected the Senate amendment and the bill died in a conference committee due to the Virginia State Police complaining that the federal government was threatening to pull out of MOUs. The 2014 bill passed the House of Delegates unanimously, but died in the Senate without a hearing. The 2015 bill passed the House of Delegates 96–4, passed out of Senate committee 7–6, and was recommitted to the Committee at the direction of Senate Majority Leader Thomas K. Norment, where it died without another vote.

Interstate 81 
Interstate 81 is the main branch of the Interstate Highway System in the 24th district. In 2005, Cline patroned HB2554, a bill that created the I-81 Safety Task Force, and HJ709, a resolution that encouraged Congress to develop a multistate I-81 initiative. In 2006, he patroned HB1581, which created the I-81 Intermodal Rail study.

U.S. House of Representatives

Elections

2018

Convention 
Cline announced his candidacy for the United States House of Representatives, in a bid to replace outgoing Representative Bob Goodlatte, for whom Cline had previously served as chief of staff. He entered a field of eight candidates, his top rival being Cynthia Dunbar, the incumbent RNC Committeewoman from Virginia.

The convention process was immediately tainted by accusations that the District Committee leadership was attempting to slant the convention in Dunbar's favor. 6th District Chairman Scott Sayre was heard admonishing the other candidates that their primary goal needed to be to defeat Cline. 6th District Vice Chair Matthew Tederick was a paid staffer for Dunbar, as were several other members of the District Committee.

Led by Dunbar supporters, the District Committee attempted to push through a "plurality" rule for the Congressional race so that whoever got the highest vote on the first ballot would win. In a field of eight candidates, that number could have been significantly lower than 51% (even as low as 20%), which elicited accusations that the District Committee thought that Dunbar couldn't beat Cline on her own merits. This rule was challenged to the State Central Committee of the Republican Party of Virginia and overturned by the SCC. It turned out to be unnecessary since Rockingham County Clerk of Court Chaz Haywood (another candidate) dropped out of the race at the Convention and endorsed Cline. With that endorsement, Cline received 52.62% of the vote to Dunbar's 39.15%.

The final tally was: Cline, 52.62%; Dunbar, 39.15%; Douglas Wright, 3.63%; Elliot Pope, 2.59%; Michael Desjadon, 1.19%; Eduardo Justo, 0.51%; Kathryn McDaniel Lewis, 0.25%, and Haywood, who appeared on the ballot despite his late withdrawal, 0.06%. With Cline winning a majority on the first ballot, he secured the nomination and moved on to the general election.

General election 
According to Amy Friedenberger of The Roanoke Times, Cline established himself in his 16 years in the Virginia House of Delegates "as a conservative who opposes abortion rights and seeks to protect gun rights... [who said] he would take his fiscal conservatism to Washington." According to the Staunton News Leader, a USA Today newspaper in Cline's district, Cline's House campaign website detailed "his record of supporting conservative legislation in the House of Delegates... [where he] voted against a tax increase, helped make budget cuts to the state's 'bloated bureaucracy,' and sponsored legislation that would ban sanctuary cities". At his election victory celebration, Representative-elect Cline told his supporters, "Being part of the checks and balances that our Founding Fathers envisioned is a responsibility that I will guard seriously." In an interview as he arrived for his swearing in at the House, Cline described to a Staunton, Virginia, news reporter his 6th district as having 800,000 constituents in "19 cities and counties... each one [with] different character and different political affiliations".

2020 
Cline was reelected in 2020 with 64.7% of the vote, defeating Democrat Nicholas Betts.

Tenure
Cline's assignments in the House include serving on the Judiciary Committee, which includes some responsibilities regarding the Mueller Report.

In December 2020, Cline was one of 126 Republican members of the House of Representatives to sign an amicus brief in support of Texas v. Pennsylvania, a lawsuit filed at the United States Supreme Court contesting the results of the 2020 presidential election, in which Joe Biden defeated incumbent Donald Trump.

In September 2021, Cline was among 75 House Republicans to vote against the National Defense Authorization Act of 2022, which contains a provision that would require women to be drafted.

Cline was among 19 House Republicans to vote against the final passage of the 2022 National Defense Authorization Act.

Immigration
Cline voted against the Further Consolidated Appropriations Act of 2020 which authorizes DHS to nearly double the available H-2B visas for the remainder of FY 2020.

Cline voted against Consolidated Appropriations Act (H.R. 1158) which effectively prohibits ICE from cooperating with Health and Human Services to detain or remove illegal alien sponsors of unaccompanied alien children (UACs).

Syria
In 2023, Cline was among 47 Republicans to vote in favor of H.Con.Res. 21 which directed President Joe Biden to remove U.S. troops from Syria within 180 days.

Committee assignments 

 Committee on Appropriations
 Subcommittee on Commerce, Justice, Science, and Related Agencies
 Subcommittee on Labor, Health and Human Services, Education, and Related Agencies
 Committee on the Budget

Caucus memberships 
Freedom Caucus
Problem Solvers Caucus
Republican Study Committee

Electoral history

Personal life
Cline married Elizabeth Rocovich Cline in 2007 and they are raising their twin daughters in Botetourt County. He is Catholic and attends St. Patrick's Church in Lexington, Virginia.

References

External links 
 Congressman Ben Cline official U.S. House website
Ben Cline for Congress

 
 
 

|-

|-

1972 births
21st-century American politicians
American Roman Catholics
Bates College alumni
Catholics from Virginia
Living people
Republican Party members of the Virginia House of Delegates
People from Rockbridge County, Virginia
People from Stillwater, Oklahoma
University of Richmond School of Law alumni
Virginia lawyers
Republican Party members of the United States House of Representatives from Virginia